The Pentax KP is a 24 megapixel compact APS-C AA-filterless digital SLR camera announced by Ricoh on January 25, 2017. It features a PRIME IV image processor with an "image accelerator unit" that supports its operation up to ISO 819,200. It has a 1/6000s conventional and 1/24,000s electronic shutter (available in Live View). In terms of bracketing modes, it adds depth of field and shutter speed bracketing. The Pentax KP uses the Pentax K-mount interchangeable lens system.

Compared to Pentax K-70 
The Pentax KP is similar in many aspects to the about half year older K-70 but significantly more expensive. The differences are:
 The KP has a more vintage, old film SLR looking body and they also have a different button layout.
 The material of the bodies is also different, the KP has a magnesium alloy construction built on a stainless steel chassis whereas the  K-70 is made out of plastic.
 The KP can shoot a 7 fps continuous burst, the K-70 is one fps slower.
 The maximum ISO sensitivity is four times higher on the KP (819,200 vs 102,400).
 The image sensor in the KP has a 0.1 MP resolution advantage
 The KP autofocus features 16 more focus points (27, 25 of them are cross type vs 11, 9 of them are cross type).
 The KP has the option to use electronic shutter instead of a mechanical shutter.
 The K-70 can take 20 more pictures with one battery charge (410 vs 390 shots) and two times longer flash coverage (12 meters vs 6 meters).
 The rear display can only tilt in the KP, the one in the K-70 is fully articulated while using the same LCD panel.

References

External links 
Pentax KP, Ricoh Imaging Company, Ltd. Japan

KP
Live-preview digital cameras
Cameras introduced in 2017
Pentax K-mount cameras